Hassen Gabsi (born 23 February 1974) is a retired Tunisian football right winger and current manager.

Career
Born in Tunis, Gabsi played club football for local side Espérance Sportive de Tunis.

He was a member of the Tunisia national football team, and played for the team in the 2002 FIFA World Cup finals. He also participated in the 1996 Summer Olympics in Atlanta.

External links

1974 births
Living people
Footballers from Tunis
Tunisian footballers
Association football forwards
2002 FIFA World Cup players
Footballers at the 1996 Summer Olympics
Olympic footballers of Tunisia
Tunisia international footballers
1998 African Cup of Nations players
2000 African Cup of Nations players
2002 African Cup of Nations players
Espérance Sportive de Tunis players
Genoa C.F.C. players
Serie B players
Tunisian Ligue Professionnelle 1 players
Tunisian expatriate footballers
Tunisian expatriate sportspeople in Italy
Expatriate footballers in Italy
Tunisian football managers
Grombalia Sports managers
AS Kasserine managers
EO Sidi Bouzid managers
EGS Gafsa managers
Jendouba Sport managers
Sfax Railways Sports managers
US Ben Guerdane managers